Private John Marvin Steele (November 29, 1912 – May 16, 1969) was the American paratrooper who landed on the pinnacle of the church tower in Sainte-Mère-Église, the first village to be liberated by the United States Army during Operation Overlord on June 6, 1944.

The operation
On the night before D-Day (June 6, 1944), American soldiers of the 82nd Airborne were parachuting into the area west of Sainte-Mère-Église in successive waves. The town had been the target of an aerial attack, during which a stray incendiary bomb had set fire to a house east of the town square.  The church bell was rung to alert the town to the emergency, and townspeople turned out in large numbers to form a bucket brigade supervised by members of the German garrison.  By 1:00 am, the town square was well lit and filled with German soldiers and villagers when two planeloads of paratroopers from the 1st and 2nd battalions, 505th Parachute Infantry Regiment, were dropped in error directly over the village.

The paratroopers were easy targets, and Steele was one of the few not killed. He was wounded in the foot by a burst of flak. His parachute caught in one of the pinnacles of the church tower, leaving him hanging on the side of the church. Steele hung there limply for two hours, pretending to be dead, before the Germans took him prisoner. He escaped four hours later from the Germans and rejoined his division when US troops of the 505th's 3rd Battalion attacked the village, capturing 30 Germans and killing another 11. He was awarded the Bronze Star for valour and the Purple Heart for being wounded in combat.

Later life
Though injured, Steele survived his ordeal. He continued to visit the town throughout his life and was an honorary citizen of Sainte-Mère-Église. The tavern, Auberge John Steele, stands adjacent to the square and maintains his legacy through photos, letters and articles hung on its walls.

Steele died of throat cancer on May 16, 1969, in Fayetteville, North Carolina. He was buried at the Masonic Cemetery in Metropolis.

Commemoration

Today, these events are commemorated by the Airborne Museum (Sainte-Mère-Église) in Place du 6 Juin in the centre of Ste-Mère-Église and in the village church where a parachute with an effigy of Private Steele in his Airborne uniform hangs from the steeple. Pockmarks from gunfire are still visible in the church's stone walls. One of its stained glass windows depicts the Virgin Mary with paratroopers falling in the foreground.

In popular culture
Steele is portrayed by Red Buttons in the film The Longest Day.  He also appears in the first Call of Duty video game.

References

External links
Obituary, NY Times, May 17, 1969 John M. Steele, Ex-Paratrooper Who Landed on Steeple D-Day 
Dedication to John M. Steele on 505th Regimental Combat Team website

Normandy American Heroes, The Story of John Steele, the Sainte-Mère-Eglise Paratrooper

1969 deaths
United States Army soldiers
United States Army personnel of World War II
1912 births
People from Metropolis, Illinois
Deaths from throat cancer
Deaths from cancer in North Carolina
Military personnel from Illinois